Sergey Voronov may refer to:
Sergei Voronov (figure skater) (born 1987), Russian figure skater
Sergei Voronov (ice hockey) (born 1971), Russian ice hockey player
Sergey Voronov (footballer) (born 1988), Russian association football player
Serge Voronoff (1866–1951), French surgeon of Russian origin